Luis Fajardo may refer to:

 Luis Fajardo, 2nd Marquis of los Vélez (unknown–1574), Spanish noble, political and military
 Luis Fajardo (Spanish Navy officer) (c. 1556–1617), Spanish noble and admiral
 Luis Fajardo Fernández (unknown–1936), Spanish politician of the Republican Left
 Luis Fajardo Posada (born 1963), Colombian footballer